Russell Manning Oltz (March 19, 1899 – June 2, 1956) was a player in the National Football League for the Hammond Pros from 1920 to 1925. He played at the collegiate level at the University of Illinois at Urbana-Champaign.

Biography
Oltz was born Russell Manning Oltz on March 19, 1899 in Beloit, Wisconsin, and died on June 2, 1956 at age 57.

References

External links

Hammond Pros players
Sportspeople from Beloit, Wisconsin
Players of American football from Wisconsin
Illinois Fighting Illini football players
1899 births
1956 deaths